The Ching Chiang class is a class of patrol ships/corvettes built by CSBC for the Republic of China Navy.

Overview
Named after the Jingjiang river in Guangdong, China, this class of vessels were initially equipped with the HF-1 anti-ship missile, one 40 mm anti-aircraft gun, and one 20 mm gun.

Beginning in 2012 the ROCN began upgrading the Ching Chiang class to counter the increasing capabilities of the PRC. The primary improvements were the fitting of four HF-3 supersonic anti-ship missile launchers  and the fitting of the OTO Melara 76 mm naval gun in place of the 40 mm gun on certain vessels.

Operational history
In 2020 one of the Ching Chiang-class patrol ships outfitted with special electronic warfare equipment was used to interfere with the signals collection of Chinese spy ships during the annual Han Kuang Exercise. 

The lead ship of the class, Ching Chiang (PGG-603), was retired on 1 February 2021.

HF-3 misfire

In 2016 Jin Chiang (PGG-610) accidentally launched an HF-3 missile during a dockside drill. While the warhead of the missile was unarmed the missile hit a fishing vessel and did considerable damage. The ship's captain was killed and three crew members were injured.

See also
 
Type 037 corvette

References

Patrol vessels of the Republic of China Navy
Corvettes of the Republic of China Navy
Military history of Taiwan
Ships built in the Republic of China
Electronic warfare